Alzatea verticillata is a small flowering tree, native to the Neotropics. It inhabits moist submontane forests from Costa Rica and Panama in Central America south to Peru and Bolivia in  tropical South America. It is the sole species of genus Alzatea and family Alzateaceae.

Description
Alzatea verticillata has opposite, obovate or elliptical leaves. Its flowers are actinomorphic and bisexual, and lack a corolla. The flowers and fruit are similar to the Myrtaceae but the ovary is superior. The fruit is a loculicidal capsule.

The closest relatives of Alzatea are in the families Penaeaceae, Oliniaceae, Rhynchocalycaceae of southern Africa.

References

 Schönenberger, Jürg and Conti, Elena. Molecular phylogeny and floral evolution of Penaeaceae, Oliniaceae, Rhynchocalycaceae, and Alzateaceae (Myrtales). American Journal of Botany. 2003;90:293-309.

Monotypic Myrtales genera
Neotropical realm flora
Trees of Costa Rica
Trees of Panama
Trees of Peru
Myrtales
Taxa named by José Antonio Pavón Jiménez